Pussycat Dolls Present: Girlicious was the second and final season of Pussycat Dolls Present that premiered on February 18, 2008 on The CW, and aired for a total of eight weeks. It was a joint venture between Ken Mok's 10x10 Entertainment, Pussycat LLC, Interscope A&M Records, Wonderland Sound and Vision, and Warner Horizon Television.

The show was filmed in the summer of 2007, and followed aspiring female singers/dancers competing in order to claim their spots to become the group "Girlicious". Girlicious is the creation of Robin Antin, creator of The Pussycat Dolls, who in the first season was searching for the next doll, but was now searching for an entirely new pop group by the name Girlicious. Girlicious, unlike the Pussycat Dolls, was a more urbanized, all female trio. This is the format for the second season of the Pussycat Dolls Present series, focusing mostly on female dancers/singers, looking for fame in the music industry. This season features 15 young women competing for the three slots open. The contestants are: Alexis Pelekanos, Carrie Jones, Cassandra Porter, Charlotte Benesch, Charlye Nichols, Chrystina Sayers, Ilisa Juried, Jamie Lee Ruiz, Jenna Artzer, Keisha Henry, Kristin McCallum-Vlaze, Megan Dupre, Natalie Mejia, Nichole Cordova and Tiffanie Anderson.

The album was released on August 12, 2008 and their first single, "Like Me" premiered on April 23 right after the finale of the series. The same day, "Stupid Shit" was released. A third season of Pussycat Dolls Present was planned but was cancelled due to low ratings.

Finalists

Makeovers
 Jamie: Dyed auburn and orange highlights
 Charlye: Bangs added, extended
 Carrie: Bangs added, dyed whiter platinum blonde
 Tiffanie: Trimmed, sidebangs added
 Natalie: Straightened, dyed chestnut
 Chrystina: Extended, trimmed
 Nichole: Yellow blonde extensions added
 Jenna: Dyed darker and chestnut highlights
 Ilisa: Trimmed and had shine added
 Cassandra: Edgier cut and brown highlights

Elimination chart
Colour key

Notes:
On Week 1 the contestants were called by groups except for the last six who were called individually. On Weeks 2 and 4 they were called by groups, with the weakest group up for elimination and on Weeks 3 and 5 they were all called together except for the immunity winner (called first) and the bottom four. Afterwards things got back to the bottom two system.
On Week 3 Natalie was called out by Mark McGrath but not by Robin. On Week 6 Jenna was called and then eliminated, Chrystina wasn't called at all. In the finale, Robin called the first two winners, then Charlye who was eliminated and finally surprised Natalie and Chrystina by telling them they would both be in the group.
On Week 5 Charlye and Chrystina were rewarded a Hello Kitty diamond necklace for their performance on the challenge, on Week 6 Charlye was given an extra vocal session by Kenn Hicks and on Week 9 Natalie only won to have her Extra promo aired, not immunity.
Week 7 is a recap episode.
On Week 5 two contestants were planned to be sent home, while on Week 9 the judges couldn't agree on whom to send home and kept all 5 girls.

Performances

Episode 1: Let's Get Girlicious

After some bonding where Keisha reveals herself to be a lesbian, Charlye that her father died and Cassandra shows the girls her tattoo, the 15 semi-finalists are told that they must pick one song each by a pre-selected group of three. The results are as follows:

The girls practice and Keisha's vocal short-comings are highlighted. Charlotte and Natalie have an argument, when Natalie doesn't lend Charlotte a pair of boots. The girls are taken to the Tom Tom club. At the club, the girls perform karaoke and both Ilisa and Carrie impress the judges. Back at home, Jenna is revealed to have a ruptured cyst and is taken to the emergency room. She then spends the rest of rehearsal in a wheelchair, much to Robin's astonishment. In the final performance, Group 2 and 5 are deemed the worst but Ilisa, Natalie and then Carrie are spared, narrowing the group to 12 finalists.

Episode 2: Confidence

The girls move into the house and Chrystina and Natalie separate themselves from the rest and gossip. During vocal rehearsals of the *NSYNC group, former *NSYNC member JC Chasez surprised the girls and gave advice about being in a group. The girls are taught about confidence and learn that their song assignments will be as follows:

They are then taken to a baseball game where they learn that their challenge will be to sing the national anthem in front of the audience. Only one group will sing it though and the best individual in that group will be safe from elimination at this week's performance. After a first check, the group made up of Carrie, Charlye, Jenna and Chrystina is selected to sing The National Anthem. Carrie wins immunity for being the best overall. Back at home Natalie is confronted by her teammates for not being confident at the challenge, bringing her to tears so she calls her mom who encourages her to bring her confidence up.
At the final performance, "Baby One More Time" is unanimously deemed the worst and Megan and Cassandra land in the bottom two. In the end, Megan is eliminated for being too pompous.

Episode 3: Charisma

This week is about charisma. Robin selects Carrie, Chrystina and Charlye as team leaders and Ilisa is the last to be picked. The song assignments are as follows:

Ilisa struggles with not having a place in the competition. Later the girls are taken to a listening party where they meet Nicole from The Pussycat Dolls and hear her new solo album. Then, the girls perform "I Don't Need a Man" in front of critical fans in their groups. The fans liked Nichole, Jamie, Ilisa and Natalie. Natalie wins immunity for receiving the most votes. Back at the house, Ilisa tells the girls about her story of living with a heart defect and wanting to inspire people with her music. Meanwhile, Tiffanie gets criticism for being too over the top, exaggerating her voice.

During the final performance, the judges deem all the groups as good and Chrystina lands in the bottom two with Alexis who is eliminated for not standing out enough.

Episode 4: Style

The girls learn that this week is about style and are given the following song assignments:

Cassandra begins to freak out because the song is very hard to sing and she doesn't have the vocals for it. The girls all get makeovers and Jamie struggles with her red hair, while Natalie utters her infamous quote: Beauty is a talent. This week both Chrystina and Jenna struggle with the fact that they were among the last called out by Robin the week before but Robin tells them they have to learn how to deal with constructive criticism. Jenna is also criticized by the other girls for being too lazy. The challenge involves the girls working their new makeover for a staged red carpet for In Touch Weekly magazine which Nichole wins.
At the performance, Jamie, Ilisa, and Cassandra's group is deemed the worst and despite Ron stating that they should eliminate Jamie for her attitude, a teary eyed Robin eliminates Cassandra for not having vocals that are strong enough in an elimination that is reminiscent of Mariela's from the previous season.

Episode 5: Kitchen Confrontation / Sexiness

This week's theme is sexiness and Robin raises the stakes by revealing that two girls will go home, making Jamie afraid since she has now to gain two places in the call out. The song assignments are as follows:

After their first rehearsals Natalie finds out that her grandmother has died but pulls herself to win for her family.  The challenge is a sexy dance-off on Nelly Furtado's "Do It" and Charlye and Chrystina are the last two standing. It is Chrystina who wins due to her chemistry with her partner, while she and Charlye both get a Hello Kitty diamond necklace. Cliques begin to form, with Jenna, Natalie and Chrystina (known as JNC) on one side and Nichole, Charlye and Tiffanie (also known as TNC) on the other and they come to blow when Charlye criticizes the girls for being too sexual. Tiffanie and Charlye lash out at Jenna and Chrystina while an amused Jamie watches. Jenna then sleeps through rehearsal and ponders quitting due to her feud with the other clique but is talked out of it by Robin.  At the final performance, Ron once again disagrees with Robin and wants Jenna out but in the end it's Jamie, for her lack of vocals and Ilisa for her lack of knowledge about sexiness who are eliminated.

Episode 6: Vocal Expression
This week's theme is about vocal expression and the girls are assigned a medley. Nichole, Charlye, Jenna and Natalie sing "Emotion" and Carrie, Tiffanie and Chrystina perform "Flashdance... What a Feeling" and then all the girls perform a dance routine at the end of the lat song. Natalie storms out on Ken Hicks in rehearsal after he refuses to give her a line she wants to sing but apologizes after a discussion with Carrie and Tiffanie. The girls record Girlicious's first song, "Leave You Alone" at Geffen Records and despite Natalie's vocal improvement it is Tiffanie who wins immunity. However, Natalie is mentioned for her "surprise attack."

Charlye struggles with being away from home as her father has died while she was on a class trip years before and wins an extra vocal session by Ken Hicks. Chrystina is told to open but at the last minute soundcheck due to her lack of knowledge of the lyrics her part is swapped with Carrie's. At the performance Chrystina lands in the bottom two with Jenna, who is criticized for her lack of energy. In the end, Jenna is eliminated.

Episode 7: A Look Back
This episode shows never before seen footage such as the girls' hidden talents, a pole dancing lesson which Alexis refuses to attend a few days before her elimination, Carrie, Jenna, Ilisa and Chrystina getting cozy with the male dancers, the judges bloopers, Natalie's breakdown after her argument with Ken Hicks, The girls receiving make-up and Tiffanie trying to take it all, Carrie getting sick during the male dance challenge, Charlye and Jenna's catfight and Nichole singing while Natalie was being comforted after her grandmother died which the other girls though was disrespectful.
 In this episode, the editors erroneously left in a scene with Kenn Hicks and the five remaining girls singing Leave You Alone, which allowed some keen-eyed fans to determine that Carrie would be eliminated in the following episode.

Episode 8: Star Quality

The week is about star quality and the tension stays in the 2 cliques. Chrystina gets upset after getting put in a group with Charlye and Tiffanie, her biggest rivals.
The six girls film the music video for "Leave You Alone" on a yacht and the girl singing the solo in the song will be safe from elimination. Charlye wins. The week's songs were:

Carrie lands in the bottom 2 with Natalie. The judges decide that Carrie can stand alone and be a solo artist whereas Natalie needs a group to back her up and thus Carrie is eliminated despite a good performance that night.

Episode 9: Public Image

After a few low blows on the way home, the girls learn about the week's theme: public image. They go on a media tour to KIIS-FM, where Chrystina forgets her lyrics while Tiffanie manages to be diplomatic about the tensions. They then go to Extra where Chrystina once again struggles but Natalie shines during her promo, winning herself the prize to have it aired nationally.
Tiffanie then realizes that the girls have to sort out their differences as Robin might put girls from the two cliques in the group. Charlye however, pretexting a headache, refuses to put forth the effort.
The girls then learn that they will all perform Pussycat Dolls songs together.

At the performance, Natalie finally nails her vocals while using her lower register. Chrystina and Charlye land in the bottom two, Chrystina for her lack of consistency despite a strong performance and Charlye for not mixing well with the group. Chrystina is called, leaving a sad Charlye thinking she is going home. However, Robin reveals that the judges couldn't agree on sending anybody home and everyone moves on to the finale.

Episode 10: You Are Girlicious
This week the girls learn their final lesson, be themselves. They then each get few minutes with Ron Fair and Charlye is a little too honest about the tensions, compromising her chances. The girls then learn their final song assignments:

 Group performance - "Ladies' Night"

Chrystina struggles with not knowing her song but thanks to Natalie she pulls off her strongest performance to date. Charlye is once again criticized for not mixing with the group and her desire is questioned, while Nichole is told she should push more.
In the end, Robin calls Nichole first, thanks to her fitting right in the image of the group. She then calls Tiffanie as the second member of the group. She then calls a girl who will not be in Girlicious, Charlye, who is told to hang up her boa. Robin then manages the suspense before revealing the final member and Natalie begins to hope that both her and Chrystina will be in the group. Indeed, Robin states that while "three girls in this group is great , four girls are Girlicious". After that, the music video for "Like Me" is aired.

Post show careers
Alexis, Ilisa and Jenna have all released songs on their respective Myspaces.

Ilisa Juried
Ilisa Juried
recently featured in the Willow Smith video, "Whip My Hair" and released the video for her new single "Sensation", available to view on YouTube. In 2010, she played a dancer in the movie Masturbate for Life. She signed a deal with the American Heart Association and Union Bank, where she performed at the Rose Parade with her 2017 single, "Live Your Life", in front of 70 million people on the American Heart Association/Union Bank parade float. She has performed at N.A.M.M for Sennheiser and recently worked with FOX Network to do promo for the LIVE version of "RENT" (2019). Ilisa has now opened her non-profit organization, "LubJu" which focuses on heart health and telling her testimony of cardiac arrest.

Carrie Jones
Carrie Jones joined the group Angels of Modern Destruction.

Tiffanie Anderson
Since being dropped from Girlicious, Tiffanie has been featured on the song "Meltin Like Ice Cream" by Chanel West Coast. She is now an artist painting portraits of various people.

Jamie Lee Ruiz
Jamie has taken part in multiple Robin Antin endeavors such as performing with the Vegas Dolls and appearing in her work-out DVD and Matt Goss's video. She has also appeared in Ester Dean's video as a dancer. She also appeared in Kelly Clarkson's music video for "I Do Not Hook Up" as a bar dancer. In 2010 she performed in the film Burlesque as one of the dancers in the audition sequence.

She recently appeared on an advert promoting the new game Michael Jackson: The Experience airing in the UK and is currently part of girl group YLA.

Jenna Artzer
In 2011, Jenna Artzer
signed a record deal with Blackground Records. She has songs such as "Mind Funk" and "Falling to Pieces" featuring rapper 2 Chainz.

Cassandra Porter
Is a professional dancer?

Charlotte Benesch
Charlotte Benesch is now an actress. In 2013, she appeared in episode 4 of the TV series The X Factor. She also had a music page on Soundcloud.

Megan Dupre
In 2012, she appeared in the movie The Hit Girl.

In 2012, she appeared in Pitch Perfect

Chrystina Sayers
In 2011, she appeared as Dancer #1 in an episode of the TV series The Closer.

Past show careers (before appearing in "PCD Present: Girlicious")

Keisha Henry
Before appearing in PCD Present: Girlicious , she was a lead vocalist in the group Tom Gurl Four.

Natalie Mejia

Before appearing in "PCD Present: Girlicious", she was a singer on two groups, "Cherri" and "Breathe".

Ratings

References

External links
 

The CW original programming
Television series by Warner Horizon Television
2000s American reality television series
2008 American television series debuts
2008 American television series endings
The Pussycat Dolls

pt:Pussycat Dolls Present#Pussycat Dolls Present: Girlicious